Irvin Josué Reyna Zavala (born 7 June 1987) is a Honduran football player, who currently plays for C.D. Real De Minas in the Honduran Liga Nacional.

Club career
Reyna started his career at Club Deportivo Olimpia but joined C.D. Necaxa for the 2010 Apertura championship.

He then returned to Olimpia for the 2012 Clausura championship.

International career
Reyna was part of the U-23 Honduras national football team that won the 2008 CONCACAF Men's Pre-Olympic Tournament and qualified to the 2008 Summer Olympics. He made his senior debut for Honduras in a September 2010 friendly match against El Salvador which has proved to be his only cap still as of May 2013.

References

External links

 

1987 births
Living people
People from Tela
Association football midfielders
Honduran footballers
Honduras international footballers
C.D. Olimpia players
C.D. Necaxa players
F.C. Motagua players
C.D. Honduras Progreso players
C.D. Real de Minas players
Liga Nacional de Fútbol Profesional de Honduras players
Honduran Liga Nacional de Ascenso players
Honduras under-20 international footballers